Dishiswar Shiva Temple is located in Bhubaneswar, Orissa, India. The presiding deity is a Shiva-lingam within a circular yoni pitha installed inside the sanctum.

Description
This 15th-century, privately owned temple is situated within a private compound surrounded by private residential buildings on three sides of east, west, south and the road on the north.

Laterite has been used as the building material with the dry masonry construction technique and the kalingan style.

Present state
The temple is in a dilapidated state, due to the growth of vegetation all over the superstructure and the surrounding area. Cracks are noticeable in the roof and in the conjunction of the pagas. The temple was repaired by State Archaeology during X and XI Finance Commission Award.

See also
 List of temples in Bhubaneswar

References
 

Shiva temples in Odisha
Hindu temples in Bhubaneswar
15th-century Hindu temples